Muhayil Mahayel Asir Governorate is a Saudi governorate belonging to the Asir region. It is located in the southwest of the Kingdom of Saudi Arabia, about 80 km northwest of the city of Abha, the capital of the Asir region. It is bordered on the north by Bariq Governorate, on the south by Rijal Alma’ Governorate, and on the east by the city of Abha, the headquarters of the Emirate of the Asir Region. And from the west, Al-Barak Governorate. is one of the governorates in 'Asir Region, Saudi Arabia.

References 

Populated places in 'Asir Province
Governorates of Saudi Arabia